Justina and Justine are anglicised versions of the Latin name Iustina, feminine of Iustinus, a derivative of Iustus, meaning fair or just. For the masculine version of the name, see Justin (name).

Translations
Russian: Устинья, Юстина, Иустина
Belarusian: Юстына, Юсціна
Czech: Justina or Justýna
Croatian: Justina, Justa, Juste
Slovakian: Justína
Romanian: Iustina
Hungarian: Jusztina
Finnish: Justiina
Greek: Ιουστίνη (Ioustine)
Lithuanian: Justina, Justė
Polish: Justyna  
Ukrainian: Юстина
Italian: Giustina
French: Justine
Portuguese: Justina
Spanish: Justina
Swedish: Justina
Arabic:يوستينا (Youstina)
Albanian:Gjystina

People named Justina

Ancient and medieval eras 
 Saint Justina of Cagliari (died 130), Christian martyr - see Justa, Justina and Henedina
 Saint Justina of Padua (died c. 304), Christian martyr
 Saint Justina of Antioch (died 304), Christian martyr - see Cyprian and Justina
 Justina (empress) (c. 340–c. 388), second wife of Roman Emperor Valentinian I and mother of Emperor Valentinian II
 Justina Szilágyi (1455–1497), Hungarian noblewoman, second wife of Vlad the Impaler, Voivode of Wallachia and inspiration for Dracula

Modern era 
 Justina Agatahi (born 1989), Nigerian judoka
 Justina Akpulo (born 1972), Nigerian handball player
 Justina Anyiam (born 1972), Nigerian handball player
 Justina Baltrūnaitė (born 1999), Lithuanian footballer
 Justina Banda (born 1992), Zambian footballer
 Justina Blakeney (born 1979), American designer and author
 Justina Bricka (born 1943), American former tennis player
 Justina Casagli (1794-1841), Swedish opera singer
 Justina Chen (born 1968), Taiwanese-American fiction writer and executive communications consultant
 Justina Chepchirchir (born 1968), Kenyan former middle distance runner
 Justina David (1912-?), Filipina film actress
 Justina Di Stasio (born 1992), Canadian wrestler of Italian and Cree descent
 Justina Eze, Nigerian diplomat and politician
 Justina Ford (1871-1952), American physician
 Justina Gaspar (?-1986), Mozambican politician
 Justina Gringytė (born 1986), Lithuanian operatic singer
 Justina Huff (1893-1977), American silent film actress
 Justina Ireland, American science-fiction and fantasy author
 Justina Jovaišytė (born 1998), Lithuanian racing cyclist
 Justina Lavrenovaitė-Perez (born 1984), Lithuanian football referee and former player
 Justina Machado (born 1972), American actress
 Justina Mikulskytė (born 1996), Lithuanian tennis player
 Justina Morales (1987-1995), American murder victim
 Justina Morcillo (born 2000), Argentine footballer
 Justina Praça (born 1979), Angolan retired handball player
 Justina Robson (born 1968), English science fiction author
 Justina Sharp (born 1997), American fashion and beauty influencer, blogger, journalist, advice columnist, and social justice advocate
 Justina Szilágyi (1455-1497), Hungarian noblewoman
 Justina Vail Evans (born 1963), British actress, life coach, author, and hypnotherapist
 Justina Valentine, American television host, rapper, singer, songwriter, and model
 Justina Wilhelm, American academic administrator, community leader, and social worker

See also
 Justine (disambiguation)
 Justa (disambiguation)

Lithuanian feminine given names
Portuguese feminine given names
Spanish feminine given names
Swedish feminine given names

fr:Justine
pl:Justyna